The Guamanian self-governing government consists of a locally elected governor, lieutenant governor and a fifteen-member Legislature. The first popular election for governor and lieutenant governor took place in 1970.  The current lieutenant governor is Josh Tenorio, who has been in office since January 7, 2019.

List of lieutenant governors of Guam 
Parties

References 

Lieutenant governor